= Chatham Papers =

Collection of the correspondence of William Pitt and William Pitt the Younger

The Chatham Papers are a collection of the correspondence of William Pitt, 1st Earl of Chatham and his son William Pitt the Younger, both Prime Ministers of the United Kingdom. They are currently held in the British National Archives.
